Taipei (International) Airport may refer to one of these airports serving Taipei, Taiwan:

 Taipei Songshan Airport , officially Taipei International Airport, a smaller airport in Taipei with international and domestic flights
 Taiwan Taoyuan International Airport , the primary airport for overseas international flights serving Taipei and northern Taiwan